Placosaris galogalis is a moth in the family Crambidae. It was described by Eugene G. Munroe and Akira Mutuura in 1970. It is found on Mindanao in the Philippines.

References

Moths described in 1970
Pyraustinae